2003–04 Albanian Cup was the fifty-second season of Albania's annual cup competition. It began on 29 August 2003 with the Preliminary Round and ended on 19 May 2004 with the Final match. The winners of the competition qualified for the 2004–05 first qualifying round of the UEFA Europa League. Dinamo Tirana were the defending champions, having won their thirteenth Albanian Cup last season. The cup was won by Partizani.

The rounds were played in a two-legged format similar to those of European competitions. If the aggregated score was tied after both games, the team with the higher number of away goals advanced. If the number of away goals was equal in both games, the match was decided by extra time and a penalty shootout, if necessary.

Preliminary round
Games were played on 29 August – 4 September 2003.

|}

First round
All fourteen teams of the 2002–03 Superliga and First Division entered in this round, along with Preliminary Round winners. Games were played on 17 September – 1 October 2003.

|}

Second round
First legs were played on 12 November 2003 and the second legs were played on 26 November 2003.

|}

Quarter-finals
In this round entered the 8 winners from the previous round.

|}

Semi-finals
In this round entered the four winners from the previous round.

|}

Final

References

External links
 Official website 

Cup
2003–04 domestic association football cups
2003-04